Ace Combat 5: The Unsung War is a 2004 combat flight simulation video game developed and published by Namco for the PlayStation 2. The game was developed by Project Aces, an internal Namco group credited with the development of the Ace Combat series. A limited number of the games were bundled with the Hori Flightstick 2 accessory.

Ace Combat 5 features more than fifty licensed real-world jet aircraft. Nonetheless, the game's events and locations are set in a fictional world. The game's main campaign is set during a war between the fictional nations of Osea and Yuktobania. The storyline revolves around the player character "Blaze", an Osean fighter pilot who leads a four-plane unit known as Wardog Squadron, as they attempt to ward off the Yuktobanian invasion of their homeland and uncover the truth about the war. Unlike its predecessors, Ace Combat 5 does not include a multiplayer mode, as developers did not have enough extended time to implement one.

Although a majority of the gameplay in Ace Combat 5 remains similar to that of its predecessor, Ace Combat 04: Shattered Skies, several notable additions were made. Among these additions are an arcade mode and the ability for the player to interact with wingmen. The multiplayer mode present in previous titles, however, was scrapped during development. The game received generally favorable reviews, although critics noted that the game was not the "revolutionary step forward for the series" that Shattered Skies was.

The game was rereleased on the PlayStation 4 in 2019, as part of a pre-order bonus for Ace Combat 7: Skies Unknown. Bandai Namco has since clarified that it is not a remaster, but instead a port of the PlayStation 2 original, running natively on the PlayStation 4 at higher resolutions.

Gameplay

Ace Combat 5: The Unsung War is divided into three gamemodes: Campaign, where players progress through story-driven levels; Arcade, which removes most of the story from Campaign mode in favor of gameplay; and Tutorial, which teaches the player the base mechanics. The gameplay in these three modes is largely consistent; players pilot an aircraft and must complete a series of missions that must be completed in the allotted amount of time. Missions feature a wide array of objectives, ranging from destroying all enemy aircraft in a level to protecting a specific target from enemy fire. The game features over fifty playable aircraft, including military and experimental aircraft licensed from the United States and Europe, in addition to original designs created specifically for the game. The majority of these aircraft are unlocked by progressing through the Campaign mode, while others are unlocked while destroying a certain amount of enemies with a particular craft.

In the Campaign mode, the player can issue orders to computer-controlled ally fighters, a method known as wingman interaction. With this, players can have fighters team up to take down a single target or spread out to cover more ground. Wingmen can be assigned specific aircraft before beginning a mission. Completing missions awards money that can be used to purchase aircraft, while certain missions unlock side games like midair refueling. The player's fighter has a limited number of ammunition, especially on harder difficulties. These fighters are also equipped with side weaponry unique to a particular model, such as guided bombs and salvo missiles that can be lock into multiple ground-stationed targets or aerial enemies.

Plot

The plot of the campaign revolves around a conflict fought between Osea and Yuktobania, the two superpowers of the series' universe of Strangereal. In late 2010, Yuktobania unexpectedly declares war against Osea and initially begins with the advantage, though this is gradually chipped away by Wardog Squadron, a small Osean auxiliary squadron posted to the front lines. Wardog's successes, including sinking Yuktobania's two gigantic submersible aircraft carriers and ballistic missile launchers, turn the tide of the war in favor of Osea, and their presence in battle increases the morale of Osean forces whilst striking fear into the Yuktobanians; this earns them the attention of Albert Genette, an Osean journalist who stays at Wardog's air base, intending to publish a news article about the squadron.

Despite their successes, Wardog begins to suspect an unknown third party is posing as Osean and Yuktobanian pilots and manipulating events on both sides of the war, engineering attacks on civilian targets to discredit Wardog and exploit the hatred between the two countries to ensure the war continues. Wardog clears their names, but the third party begins attacking them directly, first ambushing the squadron during a flypast at an Osean political rally which results in Wardog's first combat loss, and again during an aerial refueling, which the squadron narrowly escapes.

Squadron mechanic "Pops" tells Genette about the existence of the "Grey Men", a paramilitary group from Belka, a nation bitterly defeated by both countries in a war 15 years prior to the game's events, and suspects that they may be involved in the conspiracy against Wardog. He and Genette take their concerns to the base commander, only to discover that his adjutant, who is secretly part of the Grey Men, has framed the two of them, and Wardog Squadron, of being enemy spies. The commander orders their arrest, but they flee the base in stolen training jets with the assistance of Pops, who is revealed to be a former Belkan ace pilot himself.

Meeting with a friendly Osean aircraft carrier after faking their deaths, the renamed Razgriz Squadron rescues the Osean and Yuktobanian heads of state from captivity, confirming the Belkan conspiracy. It is learned that the people of both countries have become opposed to the war, and that the Grey Men are ultimately planning on using nuclear weapons on Osean and Yuktobanian cities to finally avenge their defeat and unite Belka once more. Razgriz foils their plans, and Osea and Yuktobania learn of the conspiracy and join forces to defeat the Grey Men. Razgriz spearheads an assault on the Grey Men's control facility for a hijacked orbital weapons platform, and intercepts and destroys the platform itself when it is deliberately deorbited to impact the Osean capitol, ending the war and restoring peace between the two nations.

Development
Namco first announced Ace Combat 5 was in development during the 2002 Tokyo CG Festival, in a presentation focusing upon computer graphics. Later, in 2003, Namco launched an official website promoting "Project Aces", originally thought to be a working title for Ace Combat 5. "Project Aces" was later revealed to be the name for the internal Namco development team responsible for the Ace Combat series; Ace Combat 5 was the first title to directly credit its development to the Project Aces team.

To ensure accuracy in the depiction of the game's aircraft, Project Aces was given permission by participating aircraft manufacturers to examine in person the planes that were to appear in the game. The visual team also made use of satellite images from the Japan Space Imaging Corporation in the development of the game's environments. Moreover, Project Aces incorporated full-motion video into the cutscenes of The Unsung War, as opposed to the still images used in the plot sequences of previous titles.

Hiroshi Tanaka, the Namco localization producer for Ace Combat 5, highlights wingman interaction as one of the key distinguishing features between the game and its predecessors. Tanaka said that the wingman interaction feature introduces a "strategic and fun aspect of battle". Tanaka also stated that because wingmen play a role in the story, the player can become more involved with the characters and the drama than in Ace Combat 04. A third fictional aircraft, the ADLER, was planned but not fully developed due to time constraints.

The background music of the game's main campaign mode is primarily orchestral, although the arcade mode features rock music to complement its missions' more frantic pace. The game additionally features three vocal tracks. One is "The Unsung War", a Latin choral piece performed by the Warsaw National Philharmonic Orchestra, that reiterates the "Demon of Razgriz" legend introduced in the game's campaign. Another is "The Journey Home", a recurring song that implies a theme of peace during the campaign. The game also features the licensed track "Blurry" by Puddle of Mudd, which is featured during the game's opening trailer, one cutscene, and the closing credits.

Hori Flightstick 2
Officially branded as the Ace Combat Flightstick 2, the Hori Flightstick 2 is a game peripheral specifically designed for Ace Combat 5: The Unsung War. According to Hiroshi Tanaka, Namco and Hori worked together closely to ensure "that the game, the stick, and the controls matched exactly how it should play". Unlike the original Flightstick peripheral designed for Ace Combat 04: Shattered Skies, the Flightstick 2 was released in North America in addition to Japan. In the United States, the accessory was released exclusively as a bundle with Ace Combat 5; only 20,000 bundles were made available in the limited edition offer.

The Flightstick 2 connects to the PS2 through a USB port. Unlike the PS2 DualShock 2 controller, the Flightstick 2 uses a HOTAS, or "hands on throttle and stick" design similar to that used in actual aircraft. The right hand controls the flight stick, which controls the plane's attitude; the left hand controls the throttle. Buttons, D-pads, and rudder controls are placed directly onto either the flight stick or the throttle. Although the Flightstick 2 does not offer force feedback, it does have a vibration feature. Although the Flightstick 2 was targeted specifically for use with Ace Combat 5, not all of the buttons on the peripheral are utilized in the game.

Ace Combat 5 is the only game officially sanctioned for use with the Flightstick 2. In a review of the peripheral, IGN commented that although the Hori Flightstick 2 was "nearly perfect in what it does, [...] at the moment it really only does one thing and that's play Ace Combat 5". However, the Flightstick 2 is also compatible with Ace Combat 04: Shattered Skies and Ace Combat Zero: The Belkan War.

Reception

Ace Combat 5: The Unsung War was marked with strong sales, selling over 287,400 copies in Japan and over one million copies in North America, though it undersold Ace Combat 04 by around 800,000 copies. The game was also favorably received by critics. Although reviewers point out that the game is remarkably similar to Ace Combat 04, most also agree that the game's similarity to its predecessor did not detract from its overall quality. According to GameSpot, "this latest installment doesn't do much to change an already-winning formula—but not much was needed to keep this series feeling fresh and exciting".

Overall, critics' reception of the title's gameplay was positive, particularly for the game's intuitive control schemes and large assortment of playable aircraft. The gameplay was also applauded for its "ideal" place between "overtly arcadey rubbish and inaccessible hardcore simulation". On review aggregator website Metacritic, the game has a score of 84/100, indicating "generally favorable" reviews.

Reception of the game's new features, however, was mixed. The game's redesigned "target view" function was decried as "almost broken". Although GameSpy welcomed improvements to the game's radar display, other additions such as wingman commands were seen as "gimmicky" and having little effect on gameplay. The game's arcade mode was described as fun but lacking in features and storyline.

The game's presentation was better received. Various critics praised the way that the game's storyline ties cohesively with the missions, allowing for better and more involving gameplay. GameSpot praised the game for its "captivating storyline". IGN applauded that the game recognizes the player's accomplishments, adding a "sense of worth" to the campaign. Although GameSpy felt that the menu interface was not optimized in terms of usability, it lauded the look of the game's cinematics and briefing screens. Although others believed that the player's responses to wingmen had little effect on gameplay, Game Informer felt that the feature was a "brilliant way to create atmosphere".

The game was acclaimed for its graphics, particularly its improved special and environmental effects and its authentically modeled aircraft, but critics noted that the high level of visual improvement in some areas contrasts with little improvement in others. The game's voice acting received mixed reactions. Although some felt that taken as a whole the radio chatter sets the game's atmosphere and creates a "hectic feel", most critics felt that much of the chatter was contextually inappropriate or annoying. GameSpy compared the voice work in 5 negatively with that in 04, feeling that the dialogue seemed "forced" and that sometimes "characters start to blabber just because they can".

Notes

References

External links

2004 video games
Ace Combat
Anti-war video games
Combat flight simulators
PlayStation 2 games
PlayStation 2-only games
Video games developed in Japan
Video games set in 2010
Video games set in a fictional country
Single-player video games